Sankt Georgen bei Grieskirchen is a municipality in the district of Grieskirchen in the Austrian state of Upper Austria.

Geography
Sankt Georgen lies in the Hausruckviertel. About 14 percent of the municipality is forest, and 78 percent is farmland.

History
The municipality bears the coat of arms of its former lords, the Jörger von Tollet family.

References

Cities and towns in Grieskirchen District